Harold Fraser (9 November 1889 – 19 January 1962), known professionally as Snub Pollard, was an Australian-born vaudevillian, who became a silent film comedian in Hollywood, popular in the 1920s.

Career 
Born in Melbourne, Australia, on 9 November 1889, Pollard began performing with Pollard's Lilliputian Opera Company at a young age. Like many of the actors in the popular juvenile company, he adopted Pollard as his stage name. The company ran several highly successful professional children's troupes that traveled Australia and New Zealand in the late nineteenth and early twentieth century. In 1908, Harry Pollard joined the company tour to North America. After the completion of the tour, he returned to the US. By 1915 he was regularly appearing in uncredited roles in movies, for example, Charles Epting notes that Pollard can clearly be seen in Chaplin's 1915 short By the Sea. In later years, Pollard claimed Hal Roach had discovered him while he was performing on stage in Los Angeles.

Pollard played supporting roles in the early films of Harold Lloyd and Bebe Daniels. The long-faced Pollard sported a Kaiser Wilhelm mustache turned upside-down; this became his trademark. Lloyd's producer, Hal Roach, gave Pollard his own starring series of one- and two-reel shorts. The most famous is 1923's It's a Gift, in which he plays an inventor of many Rube Goldberg-like contraptions, including a car that runs by magnet power.

In early 1923, shortly after his second marriage, Pollard returned with his wife Elizabeth to see his relations in Australia. His visit attracted considerable attention, and he appeared again in several theatres to speak about the motion picture business. On his return to the US, he left Roach and joined the low-budget Weiss Brothers studio in 1926. There he co-starred with Marvin Loback as a poor man's version of Laurel and Hardy, copying that team's plots and gags.

In later years, Pollard claimed the great depression wiped out his investments, and he had been unable to "adjust to the talkies." However, in the 1930s, he played small parts in talking comedies, and was featured as comic relief in "B" westerns. Pollard's silent-comedy credentials guaranteed him work in slapstick revivals. He appeared with other film veterans in Hollywood Cavalcade (1939), The Perils of Pauline (1947) and Man of a Thousand Faces (1957). He also appeared regularly as a supporting player in Columbia Pictures' two-reel comedies of the mid-1940s.

Forsaking his familiar mustache in his later years, he landed much steadier work in films as a mostly uncredited bit player. He played incidental roles in scores of Hollywood features and shorts, almost always as a mousy, nondescript fellow, usually with no dialogue.  In Wheeler & Woolsey's Cockeyed Cavaliers (1934), he played a drunken doctor and at the end of Miracle on 34th Street (1947), when a squad of bailiffs hauling sacks of mail enters the courtroom, Pollard brings up the rear. In Singin' in the Rain, he receives the umbrella of Gene Kelly after his famous "Singin' in the Rain" scene. In Frank Capra's Pocketful of Miracles (1961), Pollard plays a Broadway beggar. His last film, Twist Around the Clock (1962), shows him wordlessly reacting to a curvaceous woman dancing energetically.

Death and recognition 

Pollard died of cancer on 19 January 1962, aged 72, after nearly 50 years in the movie business. His interment was at Forest Lawn Memorial Park (Hollywood Hills).

For his contributions to motion pictures, Pollard has a star on the Hollywood Walk of Fame at 6415½ Hollywood Boulevard.

Selected filmography 

 Sally Scraggs: Housemaid (1913, Short) as Butler
 A Coat Tale (1915, Short) (as Harry Pollard)
 By the Sea (1915, Short) as Ice Cream Clerk (uncredited)
 His Regeneration (1915, Short) as Extra (uncredited)
 Giving Them Fits (1915, Short) as Luke's Co-Worker (as Harry Pollard)
 Bughouse Bellhops (1915, Short) as Moke Morpheus (as Harry Pollard)
 Tinkering with Trouble (1915, Short) as Sourball Joe (as Harry Pollard)
 Great While It Lasted (1915, Short) as Hugo Snubb
 Ragtime Snap Shots (1915, Short) as Snub Larkin (as Harry Pollard)
 A Foozle at the Tee Party (1915, Short) (as Harry Pollard)
 Ruses, Rhymes and Roughnecks (1915, Short) (as Harry Pollard)
 Peculiar Patients' Pranks (1915, Short) (as Harry Pollard)
 Lonesome Luke, Social Gangster (1915, Short) as Tin-Horn Tommy (as Harry Pollard)
 Police (1916, Short) as First Flophouse Customer (uncredited)
 Lonesome Luke Leans to the Literary (1916, Short)
 Luke Lugs Luggage (1916, Short)
 Lonesome Luke Lolls in Luxury (1916, Short)
 Luke, the Candy Cut-Up (1916, Short)
 Luke Foils the Villain (1916, Short)
 Luke and the Rural Roughnecks (1916, Short)
 Luke Pipes the Pippins (1916, Short)
 Lonesome Luke, Circus King (1916, Short)
 Luke's Double (1916, Short)
 Them Was the Happy Days! (1916, Short)
 Luke and the Bomb Throwers (1916, Short)
 Luke's Late Lunchers (1916, Short)
 Luke Laughs Last (1916, Short)
 Luke's Fatal Flivver (1916, Short)
 Luke's Society Mixup (1916, Short)
 Luke's Washful Waiting (1916, Short)
 Luke Rides Roughshod (1916, Short)
 Luke's Lost Lamb (1916, Short)
 Luke, Crystal Gazer (1916, Short)
 Luke Does the Midway (1916, Short)
 Luke Joins the Navy (1916, Short)
 Luke and the Mermaids (1916, Short)
 Luke's Speedy Club Life (1916, Short)
 Luke and the Bang-Tails (1916, Short)
 Luke, the Chauffeur (1916, Short)
 Luke's Preparedness Preparations (1916, Short)
 Luke, the Gladiator (1916)
 Luke, Patient Provider (1916, Short)
 Luke's Newsie Knockout (1916, Short)
 Luke's Movie Muddle (1916, Short) as Projectionist
 Luke, Rank Impersonator (1916, Short)
 Luke's Fireworks Fizzle (1916, Short)
 Luke Locates the Loot (1916, Short)
 Luke's Shattered Sleep (1916, Short)
 Lonesome Luke's Lovely Rifle (1917, Short)
 Luke's Lost Liberty (1917, Short)
 Luke's Busy Day (1917, Short)
 Luke's Trolley Troubles (1917, Short)
 Lonesome Luke, Lawyer (1917, Short)
 Luke Wins Ye Ladye Faire (1917, Short)
 Lonesome Luke's Lively Life (1917, Short)
 Lonesome Luke on Tin Can Alley (1917, Short) as Cafe Waiter
 Lonesome Luke's Honeymoon (1917, Short)
 Lonesome Luke, Plumber (1917, Short)
 Stop! Luke! Listen! (1917, Short)
 Lonesome Luke, Messenger (1917, Short)
 Lonesome Luke, Mechanic (1917, Short)
 Lonesome Luke's Wild Women (1917, Short)
 Over the Fence (1917, Short) as Snitch, Another
 Lonesome Luke Loses Patients (1917, Short)
 Pinched (1917, Short)
 By the Sad Sea Waves (1917, Short) as Snub
 Birds of a Feather (1917, Short)
 Bliss (1917, Short) as Snub
 From Laramie to London (1917, Short)
 Rainbow Island (1917, Short) as Snub
 Love, Laughs and Lather (1917, Short)
 The Flirt (1917, Short)
 Clubs Are Trump (1917, Short)
 All Aboard (1917, Short) as Passenger with trunk
 We Never Sleep (1917, Short)
 Move On (1917, Short)
 Bashful (1917, Short) as Snub the Butler
 The Big Idea (1917, Short) as Snub
 Step Lively (1917, Short)
 The Tip (1918, Short)
 The Lamb (1918, Short)
 Hit Him Again (1918, Short)
 Beat It (1918, Short)
 A Gasoline Wedding (1918, Short) as Snub
 Look Pleasant, Please (1918, Short) as Snub (as Harry Pollard)
 Here Come the Girls (1918, Short)
 Let's Go (1918, Short)
 On the Jump (1918, Short) as Snoopy Sam – The House Detective
 Follow the Crowd (1918, Short)
 Pipe the Whiskers (1918, Short)
 It's a Wild Life (1918, Short)
 Hey There! (1918, Short) as The New Director
 Kicked Out (1918, Short)
 The Non-Stop Kid (1918, Short) as Snub, the butler
 Two-Gun Gussie (1918, Short) as Snub
 Fireman Save My Child (1918, Short)
 The City Slicker (1918, Short) as Snub
 Sic 'Em, Towser (1918, Short)
 Somewhere in Turkey (1918, Short) as His Assistant
 Are Crooks Dishonest? (1918, Short) as Snub (as Harry Pollard)
 An Ozark Romance (1918, Short)
 Kicking the Germ Out of Germany (1918, Short)
 That's Him (1918, Short)
 Triple Trouble (1918, Short) as Flop House Tramp (uncredited)
 Bride and Gloom (1918, Short)
 Two Scrambled (1918, Short)
 Bees in His Bonnet (1918, Short)
 Swing Your Partners (1918, Short)
 Why Pick on Me? (1918, Short) as Harry Ham
 Nothing But Trouble (1918, Short)
 Back to the Woods (1918, Short)
 Hear 'Em Rave (1918, Short)
 Take a Chance (1918, Short) as Simplex Joe (as Harry Pollard)
 She Loves Me Not (1918, Short)
 The Danger Game (1918, Short)
 Wanted – $5,000 (1919, Short)
 Going! Going! Gone! (1919, Short) as Snub
 Ask Father (1919, Short) as The Corn-Fed Secretary
 On the Fire, aka. The Chef (1919, Short) as The Assistant Chef
 I'm on My Way (1919, Short) as The Neighbor
 Look Out Below (1919, Short) as Snub
 The Dutiful Dub (1919, Short)
 Next Aisle Over (1919, Short) as The Henpecked Husband
 A Sammy in Siberia (1919, Short) as Count Pop-up-skyvitch – the Bolshevik Officer
 Just Dropped In (1919, Short)
 Young Mr. Jazz (1919, Short) as Snub (as Harry Pollard)
 Crack Your Heels (1919, Short)
 Ring Up the Curtain, aka. Back-Stage! (1919, Short) as The Leading Man
 Si, Senor (1919, Short)
 Before Breakfast (1919, Short)
 The Marathon (1919, Short) as Snub
 Pistols for Breakfast (1919, Short)
 Swat the Crook (1919, Short)
 Off the Trolley (1919, Short)
 Spring Fever (1919, Short) as The Unwelcome Suitor
 Billy Blazes, Esq. (1919, Short) as Sheriff 'Gun Shy' Gallagher
 Just Neighbors (1919, Short) as The Neighbor
 At the Old Stage Door (1919, Short)
 Never Touched Me (1919, Short) as Jealous Admirer
 A Jazzed Honeymoon (1919, Short)
 Count Your Change (1919, Short) as Billy Bullion
 Chop Suey & Co. (1919, Short)
 Heap Big Chief (1919, Short)
 Don't Shove (1919, Short)
 Be My Wife (1919, Short)
 The Rajah (1919, Short)
 He Leads, Others Follow (1919, Short)
 Soft Money (1919, Short)
 Count the Votes (1919, Short)
 Pay Your Dues (1919, Short)
 His Only Father (1919, Short)
 Bumping into Broadway (1919, Short) as Director of Musical Comedy
 Captain Kidd's Kids (1919, Short) as The Valet
 From Hand to Mouth (1919, Short) as The Kidnapper
 His Royal Slyness (1920, Short) as Prince of Roquefort
 It's a Gift (1923, Short) as Inventor Pollard
 All Wet (1926)
 The Yokel (1926, Short)
 The Doughboy (1926, Short)
 Double Trouble (1927, Short)
 MItt the Prince (1927, Short)
 The Big Shot (1929, Short)
 Ex-Flame (1930) as Boggins
 The Road to Singapore (1931) as Photographer at Birthday Party (uncredited)
 The Strange Love of Molly Louvain (1932)
 The Midnight Patrol (1932)
 Bars of Hate (1935)
 Just My Luck  (1936)
 Riders of the Rockies (1937)
 Tex Rides with the Boy Scouts (1937)
 Hittin' the Trail (1937) as Bartender
 Special Agent K-7 (1937)
 Sing, Cowboy, Sing (1937)
 Nation Aflame (1937)
 Frontier Town (1938)
 The Utah Trail (1938) Pee Wee
 Hollywood Cavalcade (1939)
 Phony Express (1943) as Sheriff
 Bowery to Broadway (1944)
 The Hoodlum Saint (1946)
 Miracle on 34th Street (1947) as mail-bearing Court Officer
 Back Trail (1948) as Goofy
 Johnny Belinda (1948) as juror (uncredited)
 Adam's Rib (1949) as Man in courtroom (uncredited)
 All About Eve (1950) (?)
 Singin' in the Rain (1952) as the Man receiving umbrella from Lockwood after the song "Singin' in the Rain" (uncredited)
 Limelight (1952) as Street Musician
 The Fast and the Furious (1954)
 Man of a Thousand Faces (1957)
 Heller in Pink Tights (1960)
 Twelve Hours to Kill (1960)
 Who Was That Lady? (1960)
 Inherit the Wind (1960)
 Studs Lonigan (1960)
 Pepe (1960)
 One-Eyed Jacks (1961)
 Master of the World (1961)
 The Ladies Man (1961)
 Homicidal (1961)
 The Errand Boy (1961)
 Pocketful of Miracles (1961)
 Twist Around the Clock (1961)
 The Man Who Shot Liberty Valance (1962)

References

External links 

 
 Snub Pollard at Golden Silents
 

1889 births
1962 deaths
American male film actors
American male silent film actors
Australian male film actors
Silent film comedians
Male actors from Melbourne
Deaths from cancer in California
Hal Roach Studios short film series
Vaudeville performers
Australian emigrants to the United States
20th-century American male actors
Burials at Forest Lawn Memorial Park (Hollywood Hills)
20th-century Australian male actors
20th-century American comedians
American male comedy actors